Bhima, also known as Bhimdev or Bimba-Shah, was a 13th-century Indian king (raja) who established his capital in Mahikavati, the present-day Mahim, in Mumbai. He is identified as a son of the king Ramadeva of Devagiri.

Identification

Bimbakhyan legend 

Bimbakhyan ("The story of Bimba"), an old Marathi language poem, states that the king Bimbadev (or Bimbashah) came to Konkan travelling through Anahilavada in 1294 CE (1216 Shaka). He was accompanied by a number of people, who had left the kingdoms of Anahilavada and Devagiri because of Muslim invasions. Bimba halted at Mahim, then an island, and became enamoured with its beautiful scenery. He built a palace on the island, and his followers also built their residence there.

This poetic account is not corroborated by any independent evidence, and is of little historic value according to Stephen Edwardes.

Based on the Bimbakhyan account, José Gerson da Cunha identified Bimba with Bhima II of the Chaulukya (Solanki) dynasty of Gujarat, whose capital was Anahilavada. In his Origin of Bombay, Cunha wrote that Bhima had come to Mahim after fleeing his capital as a result of Mahmud Ghaznavid's invasion in 1024 CE. However, this identification is incorrect, as the Chaulukya king who reigned during Mahmud's invasion was Bhima I: he returned to his capital as soon as Mahmud left, and ruled there until 1064 CE. The Jain chroniclers of Gujarat recorded the achievements of the Chaulukya kings in detail, but they do not mention any conquest of Konkan by Bhima I.

Bhima II (r. c. 1177–1240 CE) could not have been Bimba either, as he was a very weak monarch. According to the Gujarat chroniclers, his kingdom ended up being divided among his ministers and regional chiefs. Such a weak ruler could not have invaded Konkan and subdued the more powerful Shilahara kings such as Keshideva II. Kumarapala was the only Chaulukya king who invaded Konkan. But he did not rule the area. Northern Konkan was ruled by the Shilahara kings around 1260 CE, and after that by the Yadavas of Devagiri.

Persian firman account 

According to a 1495 CE Persian language firman, 'Bimbashah' was a son of Ramachandra of Devagiri. After his father was defeated by Alauddin Khalji (c. 1296), Bimba fled to the Konkan coast. He was accompanied by rajguru (royal perceptor) Purushottam Pant Kavle and eleven umraos (consorts). In Konkan, he took control of the coastal towns, such as Parnera, Sanjan, Shirgaon and others. He himself came to Mahi (Mahim).

This account is corroborated by another Persian record from 1436 CE, which states that in 1290 CE (1212 Shalivahana era), 'Raja Bimbashah' took possession of a coastal territory from Karson. This "Karson" can be identified with Krishna, who was the governor of Ramadeva in northern Konkan. A 1299 CE danapatra (donation record) also states that king 'Bimbadeva' granted some land in present-day Mumbai to his rajguru Purushottam Kavle. These evidences prove that Bimba was Bhimadeva, the son of Ramachandra of Devagiri.

Religion 

Bhimdeva built the Babulnath temple. The deity in this temple is named after the Babool trees which were the main components of a forest covering the low-lying areas of this island. He is said to have built a palace and a court of justice and temple of Prabhadevi.

References

Bibliography

External links
 Raja Bhimdev

History of Mumbai
13th-century Indian monarchs
People from Mumbai
Hindu monarchs